Gaius Cornelius Rarus Sextius Naso was a Roman senator active during the last half of the first century AD. He was suffect consul for the nundinium September to December 93 with [...]lis as his colleague; the colleague may be Marcus Tuccius Cerialis, a suffect consul in an otherwise unknown year to whom Pliny the Younger wrote a letter full of tips on delivering a speech. 

The existence of Cornelius Rarus is known only through a single inscription of the second century that apparently adorned the Arch of Trajan in Leptis Magna, which is badly damaged. He was proconsular governor of Africa in 108/109, when construction of the Arch began; it was completed during the tenure of his successor, Quintus Pomponius Rufus.

Cornelius Rarus was also a member of the prestigious collegium of quindecimviri sacris faciundis.

References 

1st-century Romans
Suffect consuls of Imperial Rome
Roman governors of Africa
Rarus